In 1959, the United States FBI, under Director J. Edgar Hoover, continued for a tenth year to maintain a public list of the people it regarded as the Ten Most Wanted Fugitives.

1959 was notable as the first year in which none of the original top tenners from 1950 still appeared on the Most Wanted list.  But 1959 opened with the FBI once again facing a top Ten list nearly filled with elusive long-timers:

 1950 #14 (nine years), Frederick J. Tenuto, remained still at large
 1952 #36 (seven years), James Eddie Diggs, remained still at large
 1954 #78 (five years), David Daniel Keegan, remained still at large
 1956 #97 (three years), Eugene Francis Newman, remained still at large
 1957 #102 (two years), George Edward Cole, arrested July 6, 1959
 1958 #106 (one year), Dominick Scialo, surrendered July 27, 1959
 1958 #107 (one year), Angelo Luigi Pero, remained still at large
 1958 #108 (one year), Frederick Grant Dunn, found dead September 8, 1959

However, captures were soon made, thus once again clearing room on the list for a new batch of fugitives. By year end, the FBI had added more than a dozen additional names.

1959 fugitives
The "Ten Most Wanted Fugitives" listed by the FBI in 1959 include (in FBI list appearance sequence order):

David Lynn Thurston
January 8, 1959 #110
One month on the list
David Lynn Thurston - U.S. prisoner apprehended February 6, 1959, in New York City by police after a chase through theater crowds on the streets, after attempting to rob a Broadway restaurant

John Thomas Freeman
February 17, 1959 #111
One day on the list
John Thomas Freeman (fugitive) - U.S. prisoner arrested February 18, 1959, by the FBI in Hillside, Maryland, after a citizen recognized his photograph in a newspaper article

Edwin Sanford Garrison 

March 4, 1959 #112
One year on the list
Edwin Sanford Garrison - U.S. prisoner arrested September 9, 1960, in St. Louis, Missouri; he told the FBI Agents: "I'm
glad it's over. I know the FBI. You can't fool the FBI for very long." He had also been arrested in 1953 as Fugitive #59 in Detroit, Michigan

Emmett Bernard Kervan
April 29, 1959 #113
Two weeks on the list
Emmett Bernard Kervan - U.S. prisoner arrested May 13, 1959, in El Paso, Texas

Richard Allen Hunt
May 27, 1959 #114
One week on the list
Richard Allen Hunt - U.S. prisoner arrested June 2, 1959, by the local sheriff in Thermopolis, Wyoming, after a citizen
recognized him from a wanted flyer

Walter Bernard O'Donnell
June 17, 1959 #115
Two days on the list
Walter Bernard O'Donnell - U.S. prisoner arrested June 19, 1959, in Norfolk, Virginia, by the FBI after a citizen recognized his photograph in a newspaper article. At the time of his apprehension O'Donnell was posing as a retired U.S. Postal Inspector and was scheduled to speak before a Norfolk citizen group that night.

Billy Owens Williams
July 10, 1959 #116
Eight months on the list
Billy Owens Williams - U.S. prisoner arrested March 4, 1960, in New York City

James Francis Jenkins
July 21, 1959 #117
Three weeks on the list
James Francis Jenkins - U.S. prisoner arrested August 12, 1959, in a Buffalo, New York, motel after an informant tipped
off the Bureau

Harry Raymond Pope
August 11, 1959 #118
Two weeks on the list
Harry Raymond Pope - U.S. prisoner arrested August 25, 1959, in Lubbock, Texas, by the FBI and Texas Rangers

James Francis Duffy
August 26, 1959 #119
One week on the list
James Francis Duffy - U.S. prisoner arrested September 2, 1959, in Philadelphia, Pennsylvania

Robert Garfield Brown, Jr.
September 9, 1959 #120
Four months on the list
Robert Garfield Brown, Jr. - U.S. prisoner arrested January 11, 1960, in Cincinnati, Ohio, by the FBI after a citizen recognized his photograph on an Identification Order

Frederick Anthony Seno
September 24, 1959 #121
One day on the list
Frederick Anthony Seno - U.S. prisoner arrested September 24, 1959, in a Miami, Florida, rooming house where he had been living under an assumed name. When approached by FBI Agents he shouted, "Don't shoot! Don't shoot!"

Smith Gerald Hudson
October 7, 1959 #122
Ten months on the list
Smith Gerald Hudson - U.S. prisoner arrested July 31, 1960, in Cozad, Nebraska, after a citizen recognized him from a
wanted flyer. Hudson refused to admit his identity and was identified through fingerprints

Joseph Lloyd Thomas
October 21, 1959 #123
Two months on the list, later also Fugitive #304 in 1969
Joseph Lloyd Thomas - reappeared as Fugitive #304 in 1969; was a U.S. prisoner arrested December 16, 1959, in Pelzer, South Carolina, by the FBI after a citizen recognized his photograph on an Identification Order in a post office. Thomas had grown a mustache for a disguise. He had established himself in the used car business and had enrolled his children in a local school

Later entries
FBI Ten Most Wanted Fugitives, 2020s
FBI Ten Most Wanted Fugitives, 2010s
FBI Ten Most Wanted Fugitives, 2000s
FBI Ten Most Wanted Fugitives, 1990s
FBI Ten Most Wanted Fugitives, 1980s
FBI Ten Most Wanted Fugitives, 1970s
FBI Ten Most Wanted Fugitives, 1960s
FBI Ten Most Wanted Fugitives, 1950s

External links
Current FBI top ten most wanted fugitives at FBI site
FBI pdf source document listing all Ten Most Wanted year by year (removed by FBI)

1959 in the United States